Jumonville is a United Methodist camp and retreat center located in Fayette County, Pennsylvania, USA near the city of Uniontown, PA. Jumonville is famous for its 60-foot-tall cross that stands on top of Dunbar's Knob on Chestnut Ridge. Jumonville is named after Joseph Coulon de Villiers de Jumonville, who was killed during a skirmish with George Washington at the Battle of Jumonville Glen that set off the French and Indian War.

Cross

Jumonville is famous for its 60-foot-tall cross that stands on top of Dunbar's Knob (elevation 2480 ft). It is visible from seven counties, three states, and fifty miles on a clear day. 

Thousands of Sunday School children contributed dimes to help build the cross, and their names are sealed in the 183-ton concrete foundation. It was fabricated by Moore Metal Works of Greensburg, and erected on August 26, 1950. Dedication services were held on September 9. The cross arms project 12 feet on each side of the main shaft. The cross weighs 55 tons, and was designed to withstand 100 mph winds.

The campus was developed as the PA Soldier's Orphan School after the Civil War. The school was moved from the old Madison College in Uniontown up to the mountain location with fresh air and a healthier environment for the children. The school operated from 1875 until 1908. The Whyel Chapel was built in 1880. Students were fed, clothed, and educated, and graduated at 16 years old with a trade or skill to support themselves.

The property eventually passed through several British owners and was donated by Harry Whyel to the Pittsburgh Conference of the Methodist Church in 1941. It operated as a summer only camp until 1970, and has hosted retreats and summer camps since then.

See also
 Battle of the Great Meadows
 Battle of Jumonville Glen
 Fort Necessity
 Joseph Coulon de Jumonville
 French and Indian War

References

External links

 Western PA Conference of the UMC
 Official website of Jumonville Christian Camp and Retreat Cente

Christian summer camps
Methodist organizations
Buildings and structures in Fayette County, Pennsylvania